"Let Me See the Booty" is the first promotional single released from The Dream's second studio album Love vs. Money. The song features Lil Jon, who also produced the track. It was released via iTunes on November 25, 2008.

Chart positions

References

2008 singles
2008 songs
The-Dream songs
Lil Jon songs
Def Jam Recordings singles
Song recordings produced by Lil Jon
Songs written by The-Dream
Songs written by Lil Jon
Crunk songs